Jackie Bee (1962–1990) was an American Quarter Horse stallion who was inducted into the American Quarter Horse Association's (or AQHA) Hall of Fame in 2008.

Life

Jackie Bee was foaled in 1962 and was a gray stallion bred by Glen Davis. He sired 1009 foals in his breeding career, including seven AQHA Champions. He died in October 1990.

Pedigree

Notes

References

External links
 All Breed Pedigree Database pedigree for Jackie Bee

American Quarter Horse sires
1962 animal births
1990 animal deaths
AQHA Hall of Fame (horses)